Henry John "Harry" Jones (10 June 1878 – 26 January 1930) was a Welsh international rugby union forward who played club rugby for Penygraig and county rugby for Glamorgan. Jones played in just two international matches, but became a Triple Crown winner when he represented Wales during the 1902 Home Nations Championship.

Rugby career
Although little is recorded about Jones, he is listed as originally playing rugby for Porth Scarlets a now defunct Rhondda club. By the time he was selected to represent Wales in 1902, he was playing club rugby for Penygraig RFC, a more successful valley club that had supplied several players to the international squad since 1896. The 1902 Championship had already begun, with Wales victorious over England in their opening fixture, when Jones was called in as a replacement for Llanelli's Nathaniel Walters. Jones' first game was a home match against reigning Home Nations Champions Scotland. Although Scotland were favourites to win, a fluent Welsh team won the game comfortably, scoring four tries to Scotland's one. After this victory the Welsh selectors kept faith with the side, refusing to make a single change for the final game of the tournament, away to Ireland. Wales beat Ireland 15-0, and lifted their third Championship and Triple Crown titles. Despite now being a Championship winner and never playing in a losing game, Jones was replaced the next season by George Travers, and never represented Wales again.

International matches played
Wales
 Ireland 1902
 Scotland 1902

Bibliography

References

1878 births
1930 deaths
Glamorgan County RFC players
Penygraig RFC players
Rugby union forwards
Rugby union players from Porthcawl
Wales international rugby union players
Welsh rugby union players